A list of Spanish-produced and co-produced feature films released in Spain in 2003. The domestic theatrical release date is favoured.

Films

Box office 
The ten highest-grossing Spanish films in 2003, by domestic box office gross revenue, are as follows:

See also 
 18th Goya Awards

References

External links
 Spanish films of 2003 at the Internet Movie Database

2003
Lists of 2003 films by country or language
Films